The 2019 Michigan Wolverines men's soccer team is the college's 20th season of playing organized men's college soccer. It is the Wolverines' 20th season playing in the Big Ten Conference.

Background

Player movement

Departures

Arrivals

Transfers

Squad information

Roster

Coaching staff 

Source

Preseason

Preseason Big Ten poll
Michigan was predicted to finish third in the Big Ten Conference.

Schedule 

|-
!colspan=8 style=""| Preseason
|-

|-
!colspan=8 style=""| Regular season
|-

|-
!colspan=6 style=""| Big Ten Tournament
|-

|-
!colspan=6 style=""| NCAA Tournament
|-

Rankings

Awards

2020 MLS SuperDraft

See also 
 2019 Michigan Wolverines women's soccer team
 2019 NCAA Division I men's soccer season
 2019 Big Ten Conference men's soccer season

Notes

References

External links  
 UM Men's Soccer

2019
Michigan Wolverines
Michigan Wolverines
Michigan Wolverines men's soccer
Michigan Wolverines